Arthur Hunter (April 24, 1933 – December 25, 2009) was an American football tackle who played twelve seasons in the National Football League (NFL), mainly for the Los Angeles Rams.

Notre Dame years
At Notre Dame he played under head coach Frank Leahy who was the former line coach for the Seven Blocks of Granite and played shoulder-to-shoulder with guard Menil Mavraides, center Jim Schrader, and fullback Neil Worden as the main blockers for Heisman Trophy winning running back Johnny Lattner.

His senior year, the 1953 Notre Dame team finished the season 9–1, and had an unprecedented 12 players drafted to 1954 NFL draft.

In a September 13, 1954 Sports Illustrated article, writer Herman Hickman describes the 1953 Notre Dame team by writing:
Frankly, it's hard to see how any squad could lose such men as Halfback Johnny Lattner, Fullback Neil Worden, Tackle Art Hunter, Center Jim Schrader and Guard Menil Mavraides and still be a top-ranked team. Each was on some All-American or other. Lattner, Worden and Hunter were first-round Pro draft choices. Schrader was a second-round choice. Mavraides a third. But Notre Dame is not an ordinary football team, it's Notre Dame. . . .  Notre Dame doesn't lose too often.

NFL career
Listed at 6' 4" and 245 lbs, Hunter first played for the Green Bay Packers as their number one draft choice (Number 3 overall). After not playing the 1955 season, Arthur, then went on to play under head coach Paul Brown, with Jim Brown and the rest of the Cleveland Browns for four seasons as Center. He then played Center for five years with the slumping Rams, and finally one year with the Steelers. Over Hunter's twelve seasons with the NFL he recovered four fumbles. In 1960, he was an AP second-team All-NFL selection.

References

1933 births
2009 deaths
People from Lake County, Ohio
Players of American football from Ohio
American football offensive tackles
Notre Dame Fighting Irish football players
All-American college football players
Green Bay Packers players
Cleveland Browns players
Los Angeles Rams players
Pittsburgh Steelers players
Eastern Conference Pro Bowl players